Switzerland competed at the 2008 Summer Olympics in Beijing, People's Republic of China. This is a list of all of the Swiss athletes who have qualified for the Olympics and have been nominated by Swiss Olympic Association.

Medalists

Archery

Athletics

Men
Track & road events

Field events

Women
Field events

Combined events – Heptathlon

* The athlete who finished in second place, Lyudmila Blonska of the Ukraine, tested positive for a banned substance. Both the A and the B tests were positive, therefore Blonska was stripped of her silver medal, and Züblin moved up a position.

Badminton

Canoeing

Slalom

Cycling

Road

The athlete who finished in second place, Davide Rebellin (Italy), tested positive for a banned substance. Both the A and the B tests were positive, therefore Rebellin was stripped of his silver medal, and Cancellara was upgraded to silver.

Track
Pursuit

Omnium

Mountain biking

BMX

Equestrian

Eventing

Show jumping

# denotes a result that did not count toward the team score 
* Switzerland was upgraded to bronze medal in the team jumping competition after Camiro, the horse of Norway's bronze medal winner Tony André Hansen, tested positive for use of capsaicin and was disqualified.

Fencing

Men

Women

Gymnastics

Artistic
Men

Women

Marks and ranks from vault qualification differ as two vaults were used to determine event finalists while only the first of those counts toward the All-around total.Ariella Käslin qualified for the All-around final of the top 24 gymnasts because the number of finalists from the same nation is limited to two. Thus, five gymnasts ranked ahead of her were ineligible for the final.

Judo

Modern pentathlon

Rowing

Men

Qualification Legend: FA=Final A (medal); FB=Final B (non-medal); FC=Final C (non-medal); FD=Final D (non-medal); FE=Final E (non-medal); FF=Final F (non-medal); SA/B=Semifinals A/B; SC/D=Semifinals C/D; SE/F=Semifinals E/F; QF=Quarterfinals; R=Repechage

Sailing

Men

Women

M = Medal race; EL = Eliminated – did not advance into the medal race; CAN = Race cancelled

Shooting

Men

Women

Swimming

Men

Women

Synchronized swimming

Taekwondo

Tennis

Triathlon

Volleyball

Beach

Wrestling

Men's freestyle

References

External links
Swiss Olympic : Selections for Beijing 2008 (available in German and French)
sports-reference

Nations at the 2008 Summer Olympics
2008
2008 in Swiss sport